Alexander Arbachakov is a member of the Shor tribe of Siberia and has worked for over 15 years to protect the cedar forest surrounding the home of his tribe in the Kemerovo Oblast of Russia. As of 2006, Arbachakov was working with local peoples and the government of the region to map Shor territories and prioritize areas most valuable to both people and wildlife. In pursuit of this endeavor, Arbachakov is documenting Shor traditional knowledge to help show other communities how they can use the forests without harming biodiversity. He currently works as the Director of Agency for the Research and Protection of the Taiga in Mezhdurechensk, Kemerovo Oblast.

On May 11, 2006 Arbachakov was presented with a Whitley Award, UK’s top conservation award from The Princess Royal by London’s Royal Geographical Society.

Writings
 The Last of the Shor Shamans, Moon Books, 2008 (with Luba Arbachakov)
Shor Shamanic Epic Folktales, Moon Books, 2019 (with Luba Arbachakov)

External links
Alexander Arbachakov gains recognition through conservation work in the Kemerovskaya region of Siberia - BBC news.
Media Release - A. Abrachakov wins UK’s top conservation award from HRH The Princess Royal.
The staff of Pacific Environment convey their heartfelt congratulations to Alexander Arbachakov.
 Book Excerpt - The Shamans of the Mountain Shor by Alexander and Luba Arbachakov.
World Forestry Congress Bulletin  Alexander Arbachakov , Taiga Research and Protection Agency, called for environmental impact assessments and public control and monitoring in light of the mismanagement and illegal logging of Russian forests.
Sacred earth network Mentioning Alexander Arbachakov of the Agency for the Research and Protection of the Taiga, as also been implementing a project to study and document twelve sacred sites of the Shor people.
Sacred earth network SEN brings  Alexander Arbachakov  among five conservationists who visited New England.
Botanic Gardens Conservation International  Noting Alexander Arbachakov as a member of the Shor tribe and has worked for over 15 years to protect the forest home of his people.
Taiga Rescue Network contact Alexander Arbachakov.
World Rainforest Movement Listing Alexander Arbachakov, Agensy for Research and Protection of Taiga, Russia.

Turkic Activists
Living people
People from Kemerovo Oblast
Indigenous rights activists
Russian environmentalists
Year of birth missing (living people)